The Blohm & Voss BV 138 Seedrache (Sea Dragon), but nicknamed Der Fliegende Holzschuh ("flying clog", from the side-view shape of its fuselage, as well as a play on the title of the Wagner opera 'Der Fliegende Hollander' or 'The Flying Dutchman') was a World War II German trimotor flying boat that served as the Luftwaffes main seaborne long-range maritime patrol and naval reconnaissance aircraft.

A total of 297 BV 138s were built between 1938 and 1943.

Design and development

Originally developed under the company name of Hamburger Flugzeugbau, the type was initially designated the Ha 138. Its appearance was unique in its combination of unusual design features with its twin boom tail unit, short fuselage and trimotor engine configuration. The short hull, with its hydrodynamic step beneath and flat sides, earned it the nickname, "Fliegender Holzschuh" (the flying clog). The booms of the twin tail unit, much like the smaller Focke-Wulf Fw 189 twin-engined reconnaissance monoplane, extended horizontally from the rear of the outer engine nacelles. For hydrodynamic reasons, the hull featured a distinct "turn-down", or "beak" at the stern.

The first prototype featured a gull wing, but during the first flight it was discovered that this wing could not generate enough lift, so the concept was abandoned on the second prototype.

The airplanes had also a hardpoint for catapult launches from seaplane tenders.

Three piston engines were used. The central engine was mounted above the wing, while the wing engines were lower. The pre-production prototypes and the BV 138 A-01 to BV 138 A-06, were powered by various makes of engines ranging from 485 to 746 kW (650–1,000 hp). The first standardized version, BV 138 B-1, was powered by three 880 PS (868 hp, 647 kW) Junkers Jumo 205D two-stroke, opposed-piston aircraft diesel engines. The engine cowlings also had an atypical appearance, due to the unique nature of the vertical orientation of the six-cylinder opposed-piston Jumo 205 diesel engines, and resembled the cowlings of 4 or 6-cylinder inverted inline engines found on smaller civil and utility aircraft from the Jumo 205's propshaft placement, emerging forward at the uppermost front end of the powerplant. The choice for diesel engines made it possible to refuel at sea from U-boats, who also use diesel engines. When refuelling at sea, the airplane had to be fitted with a fuel filter as diesel fuel from ships contains some condensation.
There were three gun positions on the aircraft: there was one on the bow with an enclosed, powered gun turret with a single MG 151/20 autocannon. On the stern the fields of fire were obstructed by the tail with the horizontal stabilizer, so there was one gun position on the fuselage and one just behind the central engine. The gun position behind the central engine was a fully open Scarff ring-like emplacement which could mount a 7.92 mm  MG 15 machine gun, but most aircraft mounted a 13 mm MG 131 heavy machine gun. Only in early aircraft was the gun position at the rear fuselage left open and equipped with a machine gun, most aircraft mounted a similar turret as the one on the bow.

Operational history
During the invasion of Norway in April 1940, some of the pre-production aircraft were pressed into service as troop transports.

The main variant, BV 138 C-1, began service in March 1941.

Notable Operations 
In preparation of a repeat of Operation Wunderland in 1943, the U-Boat U-255 was sent to the East coast of Novaja Zemlya where it teamed up with a BV 138. The U-255 refuelled the BV 138 four times for reconnaissance flights over the Kara Sea, up to the Vilkitsky Strait. The BV 138 could not find any shipping however, that would make a mission for the German cruiser Lützow worthwhile, so the operation was cancelled.

Modifications 
The BV 138 was tested with the Walter HWK 109-500 Starthilfe RATO jettisonable rocket pod, used in pairs, for shorter takeoff performance.

For reconnaissance over sea, some aircraft carried  FuG 200 Hohentwiel low-UHF band maritime search radar.

Some examples of the BV 138 were adapted to specialized roles :

 The BV 138 MS variant was converted for minesweeping, and carried magnetic field-generating degaussing equipment, including a hoop antenna with a diameter equal to the length of the fuselage, which encircled the hull and wings, which was also used on certain models of the Ju 52/3m trimotor transport used for the same duty.
 Some BV 138s served with the specialist KG200, carrying 10 fully armed infantry troops instead of a bombload.

Variants

 Ha 138 V1 (D-ARAK)
 First prototype, developed under Hamburger Flugzeugbau designation. First flight on 15 July 1937.
 Ha 138 V2 (D-AMOR)
 Second prototype, developed under Hamburger Flugzeugbau designation. First flight in August 1937.
 Ha 138 V3
 Third prototype, developed under Hamburger Flugzeugbau designation. Construction abandoned due to redesign.
 BV 138 A-01 to 06
 Pre-production operational testbeds ; 6 built.
 BV 138 A-1
 First serial production, 25 built. Standard engine is the 605 PS Junkers Jumo 205 C. 
 BV 138 B-0
 Pre-production operational testbeds, in service by October 1940 ; 10 built.
 BV 138 B-1
 Entered service in November 1940 ; 21 built. Engines are upgraded to 880 PS (868 hp, 647 kW) Junkers Jumo 205D two-stroke, opposed-piston aircraft diesel engines.
 BV 138 C-1
 From this version on, the central motor was fitted with a four-blade propeller, while the wing engines kept a three-blade propeller, but the blades were reinforced and wider ; 227 built.
 BV 138 MS
 Minensuch (mine-search) minesweeping version ; all MS variants were converted from existing aircraft and had their armament removed ; the turrets and gun positions were covered.

Many German aircraft had Umbau sets available for modifications in the field. For the BV 138 there was an Umbau set for adding a bomb rack under the port wing. With such an Umbau the bomb payload could be doubled. As per German nomenclature, such aircraft held a suffix '/U'. A BV 138 C-1 aircraft with the Umbau modification would become BV 138 C-1/U1.

Surviving aircraft

No complete BV 138s remain in existence. However, the wreck of one aircraft, sunk after the war in a British air show, was raised from the seabed of the Øresund Sound in 2000, and is on display at the Danish Technical Museum in Helsingør.

In June 2013, a vessel from the Norwegian Geological Survey filmed a Blohm & Voss BV 138 at a depth of 35 m in Porsangerfjorden, Norway, not far from the WWII German seaplane harbour in Indre Billefjord.

Another wreckage of a BV 138 was identified by the Norwegian Mapping and Cadastre Authority on the seabed near Svalbard in 2022.

Specifications (BV 138 C-1)

See also

References

Notes

Bibliography
 Green, William. Warplanes of the Second World War, Volume Five: Flying Boats. London: Macdonald & Co.(Publishers) Ltd., 5th impression 1972. .
 Green, William. Warplanes of the Third Reich. London: Macdonald and Jane's Publishers Ltd., 4th impression 1979. .
 Ledwoch, Janusz. Bv 138 (Wydawnictwo Militaria 64) (in Polish). Warszaw, Poland: Wydawnictwo Militaria, 1998. .
 Nowarra, Heinz J. and Don Cox, (transl.) Blohm & Voss Bv 138 (Schiffer Military History). Atglen, Pennsylvania: Schiffer Publishing Ltd., 1997. .
 Smith J. Richard and Anthony Kay. German Aircraft of the Second World War. London: Putnam & Company Ltd., 1972 (3rd impression 1978). .
 Wagner, Ray and Nowarra, Heinz. German Combat Planes: A Comprehensive Survey and History of the Development of German Military Aircraft from 1914 to 1945. New York: Doubleday, 1971.

External links

 Article on a BV 138 which sank near Trondheim in Norway
 Website dedicated to the BV 138
 Specs
 German plane wrecks in Norway, WWII

BV 138
1930s German military reconnaissance aircraft
Flying boats
Trimotors
Twin-boom aircraft
High-wing aircraft
Diesel-engined aircraft
Aircraft first flown in 1937